Lucie Désirée Arnaz (born July 17, 1951) is an American actress and singer. She is the daughter of actors Lucille Ball and Desi Arnaz.

Early life 
Arnaz was born at Cedars of Lebanon Hospital in Los Angeles, California, the daughter of actors Lucille Ball and Desi Arnaz, and is the sister of actor Desi Arnaz Jr.
She lived for a few years in New York City from the age of 10, and attended St. Vincent Ferrer School, along with her brother, and later attended the Roman Catholic Immaculate Heart High School in Los Angeles.

Career

Television 
Having had walk-on roles on her mother's television series The Lucy Show, Arnaz made her acting debut in a continuing role in the series Here's Lucy from 1968 to 1974. She played Kim Carter, the daughter of the eponymous Lucy—who was played by Arnaz's real-life mother, Lucille Ball.

Arnaz branched out into television roles independent of her family from the mid-1970s. In 1975, she played murder victim Elizabeth Short in an NBC telefilm of Who Is the Black Dahlia?,
 and she starred with Lyle Waggoner and Tommy Tune in Welcome to the "World", The Wonderful World of Disney special commemorating the grand opening of Space Mountain at Walt Disney World in Orlando, Florida. In 1978, she appeared in an episode of Fantasy Island as a woman desperately trying to save her marriage. She has continued to make appearances in a number of popular television series over the years, including Murder, She Wrote, Marcus Welby, M.D., Sons and Daughters (CBS, 1991), and Law & Order.

Arnaz also had a short-lived series of her own, The Lucie Arnaz Show, on CBS in 1985. The reviewer for The New York Times described the show as "the always ingratiating Miss Arnaz as a psychologist who not only writes an advice column, but also takes calls from listeners on her own radio program."

Another eponymous series, this one a late-night-style talk show, aired for one season from 1995 to 1996. It was unsuccessful, but The Rosie O'Donnell Show would use the same format a year later to much greater success, prompting Arnaz's agent to pitch a revival that would not be picked up.

Arnaz won an Emmy Award in 1993 for Outstanding Informational Special for her documentary about her parents, Lucy and Desi: A Home Movie.

Theatre 

Arnaz has had a lengthy career in musical theatre. In June 1978 she played the title role in Annie Get Your Gun at the Jones Beach Theatre on Long Island, New York. This was the first production at Jones Beach Theatre after the death of longtime producer Guy Lombardo. In 1981, she played the lead female role in Educating Rita at The Cape Playhouse in Dennis, Massachusetts.

She made her Broadway debut in February 1979 in the musical They're Playing Our Song. Arnaz won the Theatre World Award
 and the Los Angeles Drama Critics Circle Award for Best Actress in a Musical for her portrayal of Sonia Walsk. In 1986, she won the Sarah Siddons Award for her tour with Tommy Tune in the international company of the musical My One and Only.

She has numerous other theater credits, both in the United States and abroad: Seesaw (first national company, 1974), Whose Life Is It Anyway?, The Guardsman (Paper Mill Playhouse, Millburn, New Jersey, January 1984), The Wizard of Oz in Concert: Dreams Come True (Concert at Lincoln Center, 1995, televised), Sonia Flew (Coconut Grove Playhouse, Florida, April 2006), The Witches of Eastwick (London, Theatre Royal, Drury Lane, June 2000), Vanities (Mark Taper Forum, Los Angeles, 1976 as "Kathy"), Neil Simon's Lost in Yonkers (Broadway), Dirty Rotten Scoundrels (Broadway, May 23, 2006, to September 3, 2006), and Terence McNally's Master Class (Seacoast Repertory Theatre, Portsmouth, New Hampshire, April to May 1999).

In 2010, Arnaz performed (along with Raúl Esparza and Valarie Pettiford) in and directed Babalu: A Celebration of the Music of Desi Arnaz and his Orchestra. A Miami, Florida performance was given in July 2010.

She toured in Pippin in 2014, playing the role of Berthe, the title character's grandmother. She appeared on Broadway in Pippin, from October 9, 2014, to November 9, 2014.

Film 
Arnaz made feature-film appearances, including The Jazz Singer (1980) in which she co-starred with Neil Diamond and Laurence Olivier. She earned a nomination for the 1981 Golden Globe Award, Best Supporting Actress in a Motion Picture. She also appeared in the 1982 comedy drama One More Try opposite her future husband, Lawrence Luckinbill.

Other works 

 Arnaz was a Trustee on the Board of The American Theatre Wing for 15 years (1999–2014).
 In October 2008, Arnaz and longtime family friend, Hollywood columnist and Turner Classic Movies host Robert Osborne participated in a tribute to Arnaz's mother, Lucille Ball, at the Paley Center For Media in New York City. The program, "Lucie and Lucy: Lucie Arnaz Shares Treasures From The Family Video Collection", included a discussion between Osborne and Arnaz about Ball, and also focused on Ball's last long-running series, Here's Lucy (which was celebrating its 40th anniversary), as well as several of Ball's television specials and guest appearances during the 1970s, which Arnaz had recently donated to the Paley Center for Media.

Preserving Lucille Ball's legacy 

 From about 2002 to 2007, Arnaz was the president of the board of directors of the Lucille Ball-Desi Arnaz Center in Jamestown, New York. She resigned over a dispute with the executive director over the future direction of the Center.
 Arnaz appeared live on stage in Jamestown at the Reg Lenna Center for the Arts on August 3, 2012, to promote the Lucille Ball Festival of New Comedy in which new comedians are invited to perform. She gave tribute to both her parents and expressed a desire to further expand the Festival of New Comedy and expand the Jamestown, New York, Lucy Fest. Comedians who performed at the 2012 Festival of New Comedy included Billy Gardell, Paula Poundstone and Tammy Pescatelli. She gave the history behind the Lucy-Desi Museum and Lucy-Desi Playhouse, and the 2011 birthday centenary for Lucille Ball (which was recorded in the Guinness Book of World Records for the highest number of people dressed like Lucille Ball in one place at one time).
 At that time, Arnaz announced intent to start using the recently renovated Jamestown Train Station to further the mission and vision of the Lucille Ball Festival of New Comedy. Lucie Arnaz praised and appeared on stage with the new executive director of the Lucille Ball-Desi Arnaz Center and applauded her work and dedication to the festival. This work culminated in the opening of the National Comedy Center in Jamestown on August 1, 2018.

In 2021, Arnaz, along with her brother, served as an executive producer of the biopic Being the Ricardos, a film written and directed by Aaron Sorkin focusing on her parents' professional and personal relationship during the time of I Love Lucy.

Personal life 
Arnaz was married to Philip Vandervort Menegaux from July 17, 1971, to April 1976. On 22 June 1980 she married actor-writer Laurence Luckinbill. Luckinbill and Arnaz live in Palm Springs, California.

Arnaz and Luckinbill have three children: Simon, Joseph and Katharine Luckinbill. Luckinbill also has two sons from his previous marriage: Nicholas and Benjamin Luckinbill.

Arnaz attended an all-girls Catholic high school, mainly because of its drama program. She is a member of Unity.

Stage 
 Once Upon a Mattress (Kenley Players, 1973)
 Seesaw (tour, 1974)
 Vanities (Los Angeles, 1976)
 Bye Bye Birdie (The Melody Top, 1977)
 Annie Get Your Gun (Jones Beach Theater, NY, 1979)
 They're Playing Our Song (Broadway, 1979)
 My One and Only (tour, 1986)
 Lost in Yonkers (Broadway, 1992)
 Wonderful Town (California, 1997 and 1999)
 Master Class (New Hampshire, 1999)
 The Witches of Eastwick (London, 2000)
 Dirty Rotten Scoundrels (Broadway, 2006)
 Pippin (Broadway and tour, 2014)

Filmography 
 Billy Jack Goes to Washington (1976)
 The Jazz Singer (1980)
 Second Thoughts (1983)
 Down to You (2000)
 Wild Seven (2006)
 Smoking/Non-Smoking (The Pack – original title) (2011)
 The Thought Exchange (2012)

Television 
Source: Archive of American Television:

 The Lucy Show (1962–1963) – Cynthia
 Password Television series Show s03e33 Lucille Ball vs Luci Arnaz. Herself at age 12.5, appearing alongside her mother, stepfather, Gary Morton, and brother
 Here's Lucy (1968–1974) – Kim Carter
 Rowan & Martin's Laugh-In (1972) Episode 604 – Herself
 The Wonderful World of Disney: Welcome to the "World" (1975)
 Who Is the Black Dahlia? (1975) – Elizabeth Short
 Marcus Welby, M.D. (1975)
 Death Scream (1975)
 Fantasy Island (1978)
 The Mating Season (1980, CBS)
 Washington Mistress (1982)
 One More Try (1982-CBS unsold pilot)
 The Lucie Arnaz Show (1985)
 Murder, She Wrote (1988)
 Who Gets the Friends? (1988, CBS)
 Sons and Daughters (1991, CBS)
 Abduction Of Innocence: A Moment of Truth Movie (1996)<ref>[http://www.tcm.com/tcmdb/title/459296/Abduction-of-Innocence-A-Moment-of-Truth-Movie/ Abduction of Innocence"] tcm.com, accessed December 3, 2015</ref>
 Bonne Nuit (1999) as Patrice
 Law & Order – episode "Bitch", as Jackie Scott, a cosmetics mogul (2003)
 Will & Grace''; episode "We Love Lucy", as Factory Boss (2020)

References

External links 

 Official website
 
 
 
 

1951 births
Living people
Actresses from Los Angeles
American child actresses
American film actresses
American musical theatre actresses
American television actresses
American radio actresses
American female dancers
American dancers
Lucie
Alumni of Immaculate Heart High School, Los Angeles
Singers from Los Angeles
Hispanic and Latino American dancers
Hispanic and Latino American women singers
American entertainers of Cuban descent
American people of English descent
American people of French descent
American people of Irish descent
American people of Scottish descent
20th-century American actresses
21st-century American actresses
20th-century American singers
21st-century American women singers
20th-century American women singers